United Nations Security Council Resolution 158, adopted unanimously on September 28, 1960, after examining the application of the Republic of Senegal for membership in the United Nations, the Council recommended to the General Assembly that the Republic of Senegal be admitted.

Senegal, along with the Republic of Mali, had been admitted under the Mali Federation under Resolution 139, until the federation broke apart on August 20, 1960.

See also
List of United Nations Security Council Resolutions 101 to 200 (1953–1965)

References
Text of the Resolution at undocs.org

External links
 

 0158
 0158
 0158
1960 in Senegal
September 1960 events